Lincoln's Gamble: The Tumultuous Six Months that Gave America the Emancipation Proclamation and Changed the Course of the Civil War is a book by Todd Brewster, an American author, academic, journalist, and film producer.

The work explores six months of Abraham Lincoln's presidency: the period between July 12, 1862 and January 1, 1863 when Lincoln penned the Emancipation Proclamation and changed the course of the Civil War. During this time Lincoln struggled with his strategy for the war, quarreled with his cabinet, and wrestled with how best to free the slaves.

Lincoln’s Gamble was published on September 9, 2014.

Background
Lincoln’s Gamble is Brewster's fourth book. Brewster previously collaborated with the late Peter Jennings to write The Century, The Century for Young People, and In Search of America.

"The Emancipation Proclamation is one of the three most important documents in American history, and yet it is by far the least known," Brewster said in an interview with dailyhistory.org: 

Brewster's quest led him to focus on the six months between July 1862 and January 1863, which "served as a neatly contained episode of Lincoln’s life in that they framed the time when he first mentioned the Proclamation and the date when he actually signed the document. More than that, those six months were some of the most turbulent for Lincoln, the nation, and the war."

The Lincoln that Brewster discovered was a man wracked by uncertainty, doubt and psychological pain. The author's introduction leans heavily on a quote from the great black leader W. E. B. DuBois who had once described Lincoln as "a Southern poor white, of illegitimate birth, poorly educated … unusually ugly … and a politician down to his toes." Although DuBois initially derides Lincoln, he goes on to say that he loves Lincoln, "not because he was perfect, but because he was not and yet triumphed."

Central argument
Describing the central argument of the book, Brewster wrote:

Reception
Lincoln’s Gamble received favorable reviews.

Publishers Weekly praised the way "Brewster brings elegant clarity to the tangle of conflicting ideologies, loyalties, and practicalities that pushed the proclamation forward, ultimately ensuring Lincoln’s legacy as the Great Emancipator."

Ken Burns, the director and producer of the acclaimed documentary The Civil War, also lauded the book, stating: "It’s hard to act from strength and a higher moral conviction when the war you’re waging is not going well. But in this wonderful study, Todd Brewster authoritatively evokes the strategy of our best president to change the terms of the Civil War and thereby the destiny of his nation."

In another positive review Lieutenant General H.R. McMaster, the American military historian who wrote Dereliction of Duty: Johnson, McNamara, the Joint Chiefs of Staff, and the Lies That Led to Vietnam, commented: 

A recurring theme throughout reviews of Lincoln’s Gamble is the way Brewster successfully captured the flawed and often indecisive man that Lincoln was, not the larger-than-life legend Lincoln subsequently became. This was Brewster's goal; as critic Gilbert Taylor explained in his Booklist review:  ABC News anchor George Stephanopoulos praised this facet of Brewster's work, writing: "Brewster gets inside Abraham Lincoln’s mind, revealing his struggles with the limited powers of his office. Here is Lincoln, the man, surprisingly ambivalent about the decision for which he is most remembered. A masterful psychological portrait." Similarly, Joseph J. Ellis, American historian and bestselling author of the Pulitzer Prize-winning book Founding Brothers: The Revolutionary Generation, emphasized the way Brewster opened a window into the indecision that plagued Lincoln, noting, "This story has been told before, but never as well, with such a firm grasp of the revolutionary implications of Lincoln’s decision, or the multilayered levels of Lincoln’s quite tortured thought process. Although Lincoln is the most written-about figure in American history, Brewster’s book is a major entry in the Lincoln sweepstakes."

See also
 Abraham Lincoln
 Todd Brewster
 American Civil War
 Emancipation Proclamation
 W. E. B. Du Bois
 The Century for Young People

References

External links 
  Official website of Lincoln's Gamble
  Daily History interview with author Todd Brewster

American history books
History books about the American Civil War